The Anglophone South School District (ASD-S) is a Canadian school district in New Brunswick.

Anglophone South is an Anglophone district operating 70 public schools (gr. K-12) in  Saint John, Charlotte, Kings, and part of Queens Counties.

Current enrollment is approximately 23,000 students with 1700 teaching staff. Anglophone South is headquartered in Saint John. The district is sub-divided into 3 regions, called "education centres", Hampton (Former District 6), Saint John (Former District 8), and St. Stephen (Former District 10)

See also
List of school districts in New Brunswick
List of schools in New Brunswick

References

 Official Website

School districts in New Brunswick
Education in Kings County, New Brunswick
Education in Queens County, New Brunswick